Lieutenant General Sir Francis Lloyd,  (12 August 1853 – 26 February 1926) was a senior British Army officer. He rose to become Major-General commanding the Brigade of Guards and General Officer Commanding London District from 1913 to 1918.

Family and early life
He was the eldest son of Colonel Richard Lloyd, Grenadier Guards of Aston Hall, Oswestry, Shropshire, and his wife Lady Frances Hay, daughter of the 11th Earl of Kinnoul. He was sent to Harrow School, but left after three years. He was a county cricketer for Shropshire between 1871 and 1873 while playing at club level for Oswestry.

Military career
Lloyd was commissioned as a sub-lieutenant into the 33rd (or The Duke of Wellington's) Regiment in 1874. He transferred to his father's regiment, the Grenadier Guards, later that year. Two years later he was promoted to full lieutenant. He obtained his captaincy in 1885 and in the same year took part in the Suakin Expedition as signalling officer to the Guards Brigade. He was mentioned in despatches for his service at the Battle of Hasheen. He was appointed regimental adjutant of the Grenadier Guards in 1889. In 1892 he was promoted to major. He became Commandant of the School of Instruction for Militia and Volunteers in 1894 and Commander of the Guards Depot in 1896. In 1898 he was again promoted to the rank of lieutenant colonel.

He took part in the Nile Expedition and fought at the Battle of Khartoum in 1898, again being mentioned in despatches and receiving the Distinguished Service Order. After the outbreak of the Second Boer War in late 1899, the 2nd Battalion Grenadier Guards was in March 1900 sent to reinforce British forces in South Africa. Lloyd was Commanding Officer of the Battalion throughout the Second Boer War and was severely wounded at Biddulphsberg in Orange River Colony. Following the end of the war, he returned home with the men of his battalion on the SS Galeka in October 1902. For his service in the war, Lloyd was appointed a Companion of the Order of the Bath (CB) in the April 1901 South Africa Honours list (the award was dated to 29 November 1900), and he received the actual decoration after his return, from King Edward VII at Buckingham Palace on 24 October 1902.

He was promoted to the brevet rank of colonel on 23 October 1902, and placed on half-pay as he resigned his command of the 2nd battalion on 28 October 1902, but was soon back as Commanding Officer of the 1st Battalion of his regiment from 1903 to 1904. In 1904 he became Commander of the 1st (Guards) Brigade at Aldershot with the rank of brigadier general. He was made General Officer Commanding the Welsh Division, Territorial Force in 1909 and appointed a Commander of the Royal Victorian Order. On the occasion of the coronation of George V in 1911 he was made a Knight Commander of the Order of the Bath. In 1913, at the age of 60, his command of the Welsh Division expired. He was promoted to Major-General commanding the Brigade of Guards and General Officer Commanding London District.

First World War
During the First World War, he was responsible for the defence of London, particularly from attack by Zeppelins, and was given delegated powers over trains and hospitals. In 1915 he was appointed to the largely honorary position of colonel of the Royal Welsh Fusiliers. He was made Knight of Grace of the Order of St John in 1916. In 1917 he was requested to continue in command of London District, and was promoted to lieutenant general. In September 1918 he was advanced to Knight Grand Cross of the Royal Victorian Order.

Lloyd was awarded a number of decorations by the states allied to the United Kingdom: the Belgian Order of the Crown and two Serbian orders, the Order of St. Sava and the Order of the White Eagle.

Retirement
With the ending of the war, Sir Francis relinquished the command of London District in 1919, taking up instead the position of Food Commissioner for London and Home Counties. In 1920 he was placed on the retired list.

In retirement he became a member of London County Council representing Fulham East. He made his home at Rolls Park in Chigwell, Essex where he died in February 1926. He was survived by his wife Mary née Gunnis of Leckie, Stirlingshire. The couple had no children. His funeral service was held at the Guards Chapel, Wellington Barracks on 4 March and he was buried at Aston Hall chapel on the following day.

References

Further reading
 Morris, Richard, The Diaries and Letters of Lieutenant General Sir Francis Lloyd, The Man who ran London during the Great War, Pen & Sword Military, 2009

|-

1853 births
1926 deaths
People educated at Harrow School
British Army generals of World War I
Duke of Wellington's Regiment officers
Grenadier Guards officers
Members of London County Council
Knights Grand Cross of the Royal Victorian Order
Knights Commander of the Order of the Bath
Companions of the Distinguished Service Order
Grand Officers of the Order of the Crown (Belgium)
Recipients of the Order of St. Sava
Municipal Reform Party politicians
Deputy Lieutenants of Shropshire
Conservative Party (UK) councillors
Military personnel from London
British Army lieutenant generals